Rhipha flavoplagiata is a moth in the family Erebidae. It was described by Walter Rothschild in 1911. It is found in Colombia.

References

Moths described in 1911
Phaegopterina
Arctiinae of South America